The Juan Antonio Garcia House in the North Valley area of Albuquerque, New Mexico dates from 1860.  It was a farmhouse built by Juan Antonio Garcia. It was listed on the National Register of Historic Places in 1982.  It has also been known as Tappan House.

References

Houses on the National Register of Historic Places in New Mexico
Houses completed in 1860
Houses in Albuquerque, New Mexico
National Register of Historic Places in Albuquerque, New Mexico
1860 establishments in New Mexico Territory